Planica 1957 was international ski flying week competition, held from 9–10 March 1957 in Planica, PR Slovenia, FPR Yugoslavia. A total of 30,000 people gathered for three days.

Schedule

Competitions

On 7 March 1957, first training on Srednja Bloudkova K80 normal hill was on schedule in front of no crowd, which also counted as qualification for the main international event. There were 38 competitors from eight countries performing with no crowd present. Helmut Recknagel won this independent (qualification) event for the main competition with 78.5 and 79.5 metres.

On 8 March 1957, second training, first on Bloudkova velikanka K120 large hill in front of 5,000 people was on schedule, which also counted as qualification for the main international event. In three rounds total of 97 jumps were made that day. Twenty-five jumps were over 100 metres and Helmut Recknagel was the longest with a jump that tied the hill record of 120 metres from 1948 set by Fritz Tschannen. Those were only trial jumps, however they were also graded by judges, if one on next two days of competition would be canceled, then two best jumps from today's training would count into official final results.

On 9 March 1957, first day of competition in three rounds was on schedule, in front of 10,000 people. There were 3 rounds with total of 124 jumps made. Helmut Recknagel set another hill record at 124 metres.

On 10 March 1957, second day of competition in two rounds was on schedule, in front of 15,000 people. Helmut Recknagel who set the longest jump of the day at 119.5 metres again, dominated the whole weekend and won the two day international.

Training 1 (qualifications) 
7 March 1957 – 11:00 am – Srednja Bloudkova K80 – two rounds – incomplete

Training 2 
8 March 1957 – Bloudkova velikanka K120 – three rounds

International Ski Flying Week: Day 1 
9 March 1957 – Bloudkova velikanka K120 – four rounds (two best counted)

 Fall or touch!

International Ski Flying Week: Day 2 
10 March 1957 – Bloudkova velikanka K120 – four rounds (two best counted)

Official results 

9–10 March 1957 – Bloudkova velikanka K120 – two best rounds (D1) + two best (D2)

Hill dimensions 

159 metres - total height difference
155 metres - inrun length
120 metres - calculation point
35° degrees - inrun incline
41° degrees - landing zone incline
wooden cottage - warm up house at top

Hill records

References

1957 in Yugoslav sport
1957 in ski jumping
1957 in Slovenia
Ski jumping competitions in Yugoslavia
International sports competitions hosted by Yugoslavia
Ski jumping competitions in Slovenia
International sports competitions hosted by Slovenia